Branislav Đekić (Serbian Cyrillic: Бранислав Ђекић; born August 12, 1991) is a Serbian professional basketball player who last played for EuroNickel 2005 of the Macedonian First League and BIBL. At , he plays at the power forward position.

Professional career
Đekić started his basketball professional career in 2009, with KK Partizan. He played for Partizan for three years while one year he spent at Mega Vizura on loan.

On November 1, 2013, he signed a one-year contract with Strumica. In his debut on November 3, he scored 14 points and grabbed 9 rebounds in a 72–66 win against Karpos Sokoli. He recorded his first double-double in his second competitive match for Strumica, against Liria with 23 points and 10 rebounds.

In November 2014, Đekić signed a contract with Kumanovo for the 2014–15 season. In July 2015, he signed a one-year contract with the Slovenian club Zlatorog Laško.

On November 22, 2016, he signed with Macedonian club Feni Industries for the 2016–17 season.

On January 3, 2018, Đekić signed with Slovenian club Rogaška.

On February 14, 2018, he returned to Kumanovo.

National team career
With the junior national teams of Serbia, Đekić won the gold medal at the 2007 FIBA Europe Under-16 Championship, the gold medal at the 2009 FIBA Europe Under-18 Championship and the bronze medal at the 2006 FIBA Europe Under-16 Championship.

References

External links
 Branislav Đekić at aba-liga.com
 Branislav Đekić at eurobasket.com
 Branislav Đekić at euroleague.net
 Branislav Đekić at fiba.com

1991 births
Living people
ABA League players
Basketball League of Serbia players
KK Mega Basket players
KK Partizan players
OKK Beograd players
OKK Spars players
People from Ćuprija
Power forwards (basketball)
Serbian expatriate basketball people in Bosnia and Herzegovina
Serbian expatriate basketball people in North Macedonia
Serbian expatriate basketball people in Slovenia
Serbian men's basketball players